Bloomfield is an unincorporated community in Benton County, Arkansas, United States.

A post office called Bloomfield was established in 1875, and remained in operation until 1904. The town site was platted around the time the post office was established.

References

Unincorporated communities in Benton County, Arkansas
Unincorporated communities in Arkansas
1875 establishments in Arkansas